Rollercoaster is an extended play (EP) by the Scottish rock band The Jesus & Mary Chain, released in September 1990. The EP was released by Blanco y Negro Records on 7-inch vinyl, 12-inch vinyl, cassette single and CD single. It reached number 46 on the UK Singles Chart and number 25 on the Irish Singles Chart. William Reid and Jim Reid were the producers for all the tracks.

Track listing
All tracks written by Jim Reid and William Reid except where noted.

7" (NEG45), 12" (NEG45T), CD (NEG45CD) and Cassette (NEG45C)
"Rollercoaster" – 3:50
"Silverblade" – 2:55
"Lowlife" – 3:25
"Tower of Song" (Leonard Cohen) – 4:48
All four tracks are on both sides of the cassette single version.

Personnel

The Jesus and Mary Chain
Jim Reid – vocals, guitar, producer
William Reid – guitar, vocal (track 1), producer, engineer (track 4)

Additional personnel
Flood – engineer (tracks 1 to 3)
Ian Cooper – mastering

Charts

References

The Jesus and Mary Chain albums
1990 EPs